SS Ellesmere was a small freighter built during the First World War. Completed in 1915, she was intended for the West African trade. The ship was sunk by the German submarine SM U-20 in July 1915.

Description 
She had a vertical triple-expansion steam engine driving a single screw propeller. The engine was rated at a total of 173 nominal horsepower and produced .

Construction and career 
Ellesmere, named after Ellesmere, a lake near Ellesmere, Shropshire, was laid down as yard number 266 by Anderson Rodger and Company at its shipyard in Port Glasgow, Scotland, for the Watson Steamship Co. The ship was launched on 18 October 1906 and completed on 22 November.

References

Bibliography

Ships built on the River Clyde
Steamships of the United Kingdom
Maritime incidents in 1915
World War I merchant ships of the United Kingdom
1906 ships